Wilhelm O. Philipsen (1852–1913), a recipient of the Medal of Honor, served as a blacksmith in Company D of the U.S. Army’s 5th Cavalry Regiment during the Battle of Milk Creek in 1879.  He was among 10 cavalrymen who volunteered to form a skirmish line on September 29, 1879, while Company D retreated from an attack by the White River Utes.  Philipsen and the other volunteers were awarded the Medal of Honor for bravery in defending their unit during this retreat.

His gravestone at Loudon Park National Cemetery, in Baltimore, indicates Philipsen achieved the rank of First Sergeant during his career in the Army. He was born in 1852 in Schleswig, Germany and died on September 15, 1913. His remains are among five Medal of Honor recipients at Loudon Park.

See also
 Meeker Massacre
 Battle of Milk Creek

References

1852 births
1913 deaths
People from the Duchy of Schleswig
German emigrants to the United States
Military personnel from Baltimore
United States Army soldiers
United States Army Medal of Honor recipients
American Indian Wars recipients of the Medal of Honor
German-born Medal of Honor recipients